The 2012 French Figure Skating Championships took place between 16 and 18 December 2011 at the Patinoire de la Cartonnerie in Dammarie-lès-Lys. Skaters competed in the disciplines of men's singles, ladies' singles, pair skating, ice dancing, and synchronized skating on the senior level for the title of national champion of France. The results were among the criteria used to choose the French entries for the 2012 World Championships and the 2012 European Championships.

Senior results

Men
Joubert won his 8th national title.

Ladies
Silété won the ladies' title.

Pairs
Popova / Massot won their first title.

Ice dancing
Péchalat / Bourzat won their third national title.

Junior results
The Junior Championships took place from 24 to 26 February 2012 in Charleville-Mézières.

Men

Ladies

Ice dancing

References

External links

 Results: Senior, Junior

French Figure Skating Championships
Figure Skating Championships, 2012
2011 in figure skating